Ségala is a small town and commune in the Cercle of Kayes in the Kayes Region of south-western Mali. The commune, which includes 20 villages, had a population of 30,305 in 2009.

References

External links
.

Communes of Kayes Region